Waldomiro Lobo is a Belo Horizonte Metro station on Line 1. It was opened in July 2002 as part of a two-station extension of the line from Primeiro de Maio to Floramar. The station is located between Primeiro de Maio and Floramar.

References

Belo Horizonte Metro stations
2002 establishments in Brazil
Railway stations opened in 2002